The art collection of the Duke of Buccleuch is mostly European.  The holdings, principally collected over a period of 300 years, comprise some 500 paintings, 1,000 miniatures and an enormous selection of objets d'art including furniture, porcelain, armour, jewellery and silverwork.  The vast majority of the collection is divided between three principal locations: Bowhill House, Drumlanrig Castle and Boughton House.

Collection

Paintings and Drawing

Dutch School
Cuyp, Aelbert Jacobsz 
Rembrandt, Harmenszoon van Rijn (Old Woman Reading, 1655 - one of Rembrandt's greatest works)
Ruisdael, Jacob van - 2 paintings (Landscape, one of his three greatest works)
Wouwerman, Philips 
Wyck, Jan - 5 paintings (Equestrian portrait of James Scott, 1st Duke of Monmouth and Buccleuch, c. 1670s)

English School
Bardwell, Thomas - 10 paintings
Beechey, William - 7 paintings
Cotes, Francis - 2 paintings
Gainsborough, Thomas - 6 paintings
Kneller, Sir Godfrey - 30 paintings
Lely, Sir Peter - 19 paintings
Reynolds, Joshua - 6 paintings (Lady Caroline Scott, 1776)

Flemish School
d'Arthois, Jacques 
Brueghel, Jan (the Younger)
John de Critz (the Elder) 
Anthony van Dyck - 3x paintings and 40 grisaille portraits (painted for 'The Iconograph''', 1645)
Jan Gossaert, (known as Jan Mabuse)

David Teniers the Younger - 2 paintingsFrench Schoold'Agar, Charles - 1 painting
Bourdon, Sébastien - 3 paintings (Portrait of Wenceslaus Hollar, 1657)
Danloux, Henri-Pierre - 5 paintings
Dughet, Gaspard - 1 painting
Dumont, François - 1 painting (Portrait of Marie-Antoinette)
Elizabeth, Madame (of France) - 1 painting
Heude, Nicolas - 2 paintings
Lafrensen, Nicolas (the Younger) (known as Lavreince) - 1 painting
Laroon, Marcellus - 1 painting
Lefebvre, Claude
Liotard, Jean-Étienne
Lorrain, Claude (known as Claude Gellée) - 2 paintings (The Judgement of Paris (Claude's earliest mythological scene) and A Seaport (Claude's earliest conception of classical style), both 1633)
Mare-richart, Florent-j. De La - 1 painting
Monnoyer, Jean-Baptiste - 19 paintings
Perréal, Jean - 1 painting
Rousseau, Jacques - 1 painting
Sueur, Eustache Le - 1 painting
Sueur, Hubert Le - 1 painting
Troy, François de - 1 painting
Vernet, Claude Joseph - 2 paintingsGerman SchoolLucas Cranach the Elder

Hans Holbein the Younger
Mengs, Anton Raphael - 3 paintingsItalian SchoolBaciccio, Il (known as Giambattista Gaulli) - 1 painting
Bassano, Francesco (the Younger) - 1 painting
Bassano, Leandro - 2 paintings
Batoni, Pompeo - 1 painting
Benaschi, Giovanni Battista - 1 painting
Campi, Vincenzo - 1 painting
Canaletto - 1 painting (View of Whitehall - one of Caneletto's greatest works)
Caravaggio, Polidoro da - 1 painting
Carpi, Girolamo da - 2 paintings
Carracci, Annibale - 2 paintings and 1 drawing (A Young Man in a plumed hat)
Carlo Dolci 
Il Garafalo, (Benvenuto Tisi) 
Gennari, Benedetto - 3 paintings
Luca Giordano 
Granacci, Francesco - 1 painting
Guardi, Francesco - 8 paintings
Joli, Antonio - 1 painting
Leonardo da Vinci - 1 painting (The Madonna of the Yarnwinder, c. 1501)
Mainardi, Sebastiano (known as Bastiano) - 1 painting
Carlo Maratta
Marieschi, Michele - 1 painting
Panini, Giovanni Paolo - 1 painting
Parmigianino - 1 painting
Pasinelli, Lorenzo - 1 painting
Penni, Giovanni Francesco - 2 drawings (Meeting of the Two Holy Families and The Vision of Ezekial, both c. 1526, two of the largest and most important renaissance drawings alongside the Raphael Cartoons)
Il Pordenone, (known by Giovanni Antonio de' Sacchis) - 1 painting
Puligo, Domenico - 1 painting
Salvator Rosa
Andrea Sacchi
Francesco Solimena
Alessandro Tiarini
Francesco Zuccarelli
Taddeo ZuccariScottish SchoolRaeburn, Henry - 2 paintingsSpanish SchoolJuan Pantoja de la Cruz - 2 paintings
El Greco  (The Adoration of the Shepards'', c. 1574-5)
Bartolomé Esteban Murillo

See also
Dalkeith Palace
Montagu House, Bloomsbury
Montagu House, Whitehall

Bibliography

External links
Boughton House
Drumlanrig Castle
Bowhill House

Private collections in the United Kingdom